The Boyle temperature is formally defined as the temperature for which the second virial coefficient,  becomes zero.
It is at this temperature that the attractive forces and the repulsive forces acting on the gas particles balance out

This is the virial equation of state and describes a real gas. 

In any case, when the pressures are low, the second virial coefficient will be the only relevant one because the remaining concern terms of higher order on the pressure. Also at Boyle temperature the dip in a PV diagram tends to a straight line over a period of pressure. We then have

where  is the compressibility factor.

Expanding the van der Waals equation in  one finds that .

See also 
 Virial equation of state

Temperature
Thermodynamics

References